Igor Ustinsky (born June 14, 1994) is a Russian ice hockey goaltender. He is currently playing with Zauralie Kurgan of the Supreme Hockey League (VHL). 

Ustinsky was selected by Metallurg Magnitogorsk in the first round (21st overall) of the 2011 KHL Junior Draft. On December 11, 2014, Ustinsky made his Kontinental Hockey League debut playing with Avtomobilist Yekaterinburg during the 2014–15 KHL season.

References

External links

1994 births
Living people
Avtomobilist Yekaterinburg players
Russian ice hockey goaltenders
Zauralie Kurgan players